Jon Tørset (born 8 July 1940) is a Norwegian politician for the Centre Party.

He served as a deputy representative to the Parliament of Norway from Nordland during the terms 1985–1989 and 1997–2001. He also served as county mayor of Nordland from 1999 to 2007.

References

1940 births
Living people
Centre Party (Norway) politicians
Deputy members of the Storting
Nordland politicians
Chairmen of County Councils of Norway
Politicians from Bodø